Sirius XM Hits 1 is a Top 40 radio station on Sirius XM Radio channel 2 and Dish Network channels 6002 and 099-02 (099-02 is only for Hopper users). Like most Sirius XM stations, it plays no commercials. The channel was formerly known as US-1 until 2004. The name is a take-off of VH1, whose name was originally an abbreviation of "Video Hits 1". Vh1 Satellite Radio once existed on XM but the channel was discontinued prior to the merger.

Following the merger, SiriusXM Hits 1 programming simulcasted on XM 20 On 20 from 9p.m. to noon Eastern for 2 years, where it was announced as Sirius XM Hits 1 On 20 on 20.

On May 4, 2011, at 12:01am EST, Hits 1 moved to channel 2 for Sirius radios, XM radios, and on SiriusXM Online. On Dish Network, SiriusXM Hits 1 is carried on channels 6002 and 099-02.

The Weekend Countdown 
Every week, Hits 1 counts down their top 45 songs, usually ranked by airplay. Songs can stay on the Countdown anywhere from one week to over twenty weeks. However, in May 2020, The Weekend Countdown switched to 30 songs.

Year End Countdown 
Most years, Hits 1 counts down their year end countdown, usually ranked by spins throughout the year. The countdowns usually have the same amount of songs as the weekend countdowns, but at times can be different. In 2012, Hits 1 only ranked the 14 songs that hit #1 that year. In 2010, and throughout 2013 to 2019, the year end was 45 songs to match the weekend countdown. From 2020 to 2022, the countdown was 30 songs, just like the weekend countdown. There are instances where Hits 1 doesn't even do a year end countdown, such as in 2011.

Year End Number Ones

HitBound 
HitBound is a weekly program airing on Saturday at 9am and Sunday at noon highlighting new music on SiriusXM Hits 1. HitBound is primarily hosted by Mikey Piff but will occasionally feature guest hosts (usually artists with music featured on the show).

Songs that debut on SiriusXM Hits 1 primarily start airing on HitBound before "graduating" to The Weekend Countdown.

On occasion, popular celebrities or artists will guest host The Weekend Countdown and HitBound (promoted as a "Weekend Takeover"). Notable HitBound guest hosts include Timeflies, Jason Derulo and Britney Spears (as a "Weekend Takeover").

List of 2014 HitBound guest hosts

List of 2013 HitBound guest hosts

Core artists
Ed Sheeran
Justin Timberlake
Lady Gaga
Katy Perry
Taylor Swift
Maroon 5
Bruno Mars
P!nk
Harry Styles
Dua Lipa
Lizzo
Jonas Brothers
The Weeknd
Olivia Rodrigo
Lil Nas X
Imagine Dragons

See also
 List of Sirius Satellite Radio stations

References

External links
Hit-Bound Songs list

Sirius Satellite Radio channels
Contemporary hit radio stations in the United States
XM Satellite Radio channels
Sirius XM Radio channels
Radio stations established in 2004